Your Home Public Library is a historic library building located at Johnson City in Broome County, New York. It is a Late Victorian style building built as a residence in 1885 and converted for use as a library in 1917.  The original section of the building is two and one half stories and constructed of brick with a stone foundation, concrete and cast stone water tables, sills, lintels, and band courses.  The design features projecting and recessed pavilions, a complex multi-gabled roof, a projecting dormer, and a turret with conical roof and tall weathervane.  A large wing was added in 1920.  Your Home Library was developed by Harry L. Johnson, brother of George F. Johnson (1857–1948), founder of Endicott-Johnson Shoe Company.

It was listed on the National Register of Historic Places in 2005.

References

External links
Your Home Public Library — Serving Johnson City And Its Neighbors Since 1917!

Buildings and structures in Broome County, New York
Library buildings completed in 1885
National Register of Historic Places in Broome County, New York
Libraries on the National Register of Historic Places in New York (state)
Houses completed in 1885